Massimo Margiotta (born 27 July 1977) is an Italian-Venezuelan former professional footballer who played as a forward, currently working as youth system chief of Hellas Verona.

Club career

Udinese

Vicenza
Margiotta was signed by Vicenza in co-ownership deal with Udinese in mid-2001. In June 2002 Margiotta was bought outright by the Veneto club. In August 2003 he was loaned to Perugia but returned to January 2004. In August 2005 he left for Piacenza.

Frosinone
In July 2006 he left for Frosinone initially in temporary deal. In summer 2007 Margiotta joined the Lazio-based club outright for €50,000.

Margiotta admitted to being involved in a football gambling controversy in June 2007. He was suspended for four months, had to serve community service and pay a fine of €10,000.

Return to Vicenza
On 21 August 2008, Margiotta returned to Vicenza.

Barletta
In September 2010, he left for Barletta on free transfer, signed an annual contract. He was immediately included in starting XI, partnered with Giuseppe Caccavallo and Nicola Bellomo in a 4–3–2–1 formation. Coach Arcangelo Sciannimanico putted the original starter Paolo Carbonaro and Saveriano Infantino on the bench. Margiotta scored a late goal for Barletta after Foggia scored its second goal.

International career
Born in Venezuela, Margiotta played for Italy at youth level and at Football at the 2000 Summer Olympics. In 2004 FIFA changed its rules to allow a footballer switch nation to be represented if he had multi-nationality. Originally targeted for player aged under 21, that year also accept any player to apply. Margiotta switched to Venezuela as he might have no chance to play for Italy. He collected 11 caps, 4 of them were friendlies.

Post-retirement
Since retired in 2011, Margiotta became a staff of Vicenza youth system, as Responsabili dell'Attività di Base from 2011–12 season to 2013–14 season (along with Alberto Ciarelli), In 2014–15 season he replaced Stefano Umbro as Responsabile Attività Agonistic.

In July 2015, Margiotta (for two months), CEO Dario Cassingena, Antonio Mandato and coach Mauro Carretta were sanctioned by Italian Football Federation (FIGC) on transfer irregularity on the signing of youth player Domenico Ranalletta.

On 1 July 2017, he took over as the new youth system chief of Hellas Verona. On 20 October 2022, Margiotta extended his contract with Hellas Verona until 2027.

Career statistics

International

Honours
Udinese
UEFA Intertoto Cup: 2000

References

External links 
 Official site
Player profile - RAI Sport
Venezuela caps - rsssf.com
FIGC 

http://aic.football.it/scheda/387/margiotta-massimo.htm

1977 births
Living people
Association football forwards
Italian footballers
Venezuelan footballers
Delfino Pescara 1936 players
A.C. Reggiana 1919 players
U.S. Lecce players
Cosenza Calcio 1914 players
Udinese Calcio players
L.R. Vicenza players
A.S.D. Barletta 1922 players
Sportspeople from Maracaibo
A.C. Perugia Calcio players
Piacenza Calcio 1919 players
Frosinone Calcio players
Serie A players
Serie B players
Serie C players
Italy youth international footballers
Italy under-21 international footballers
Footballers at the 2000 Summer Olympics
Olympic footballers of Italy
Venezuelan people of Italian descent
Venezuela international footballers
2004 Copa América players